Gibbosporina leptospora is a species of foliose lichen in the family Pannariaceae. It was described as a new species in 2016 by Norwegian lichenologist Arve Elvebakk. The specific epithet leptospora, which combines the Greek lepto ("thin") with spore, refers to the thin perispore (outer spore covering). The lichen occurs in northeast Australia, Papua New Guinea, Fiji, and New Caledonia.

References

leptospora
Lichen species
Lichens of Australia
Lichens of New Guinea
Lichens of Oceania
Lichens described in 2016
Taxa named by Arve Elvebakk
Lichens of New Caledonia